The 1895 Massachusetts gubernatorial election was held on November 5, 1895. Incumbent Republican Governor Frederic Greenhalge was re-elected to a third term in office, defeating Democratic U.S. Representative George Fred Williams.

General election

Results

See also
 1895 Massachusetts legislature

References

Governor
1895
Massachusetts
November 1895 events